James Calvin Pruett (December 16, 1917 – July 29, 2003) was a professional baseball player.  He was a catcher over parts of two seasons (1944–45) with the Philadelphia Athletics.  For his career, he compiled a .231 batting average in 13 at-bats.

He was born in Nashville, Tennessee and died in Waukesha, Wisconsin at the age of 85.

External links

1917 births
2003 deaths
Philadelphia Athletics players
Major League Baseball catchers
Baseball players from Tennessee
Hutchinson Larks players
Montgomery Rebels players
Birmingham Barons players
Charleston Rebels players
Savannah Indians players
Milwaukee Brewers (minor league) players
Jersey City Giants players
New Orleans Pelicans (baseball) players
Louisville Colonels (minor league) players
Augusta Tigers players
St. Petersburg Saints players
Columbia Reds players
Beaumont Roughnecks players
Nashville Vols players
Clarksdale Planters players
Macon Peaches players